Cangzhou or Cang Prefecture was a zhou (prefecture) in imperial China, centering on modern Cang County, Hebei, China. It existed (intermittently) from 517 until 1913.

The modern prefectural-level city Cangzhou, created in 1961, retains its name.

Geography
The administrative region of Cang Prefecture in the Tang dynasty is in modern eastern Hebei, the area sandwiched between Tianjin and northern Shandong. It probably includes parts of modern: 
Under the administration of Cangzhou, Hebei:
Cangzhou
Cang County
Botou
Qing County
Huanghua
Haixing County
Mengcun Hui Autonomous County
Yanshan County
Nanpi County
Under the administration of Tianjin:
Tianjin
Under the administration of Binzhou, Shandong:
Wudi County
Under the administration of Dezhou, Shandong:
Leling
Ningjin County
Qingyun County

References
 

Prefectures of Later Han (Five Dynasties)
Prefectures of the Tang dynasty
Prefectures of the Sui dynasty
Prefectures of Later Tang
Prefectures of Yan (Five Dynasties period)
Prefectures of Later Jin (Five Dynasties)
Prefectures of the Song dynasty
Former prefectures in Shandong
Former prefectures in Hebei
Former prefectures in Tianjin
Prefectures of Later Zhou
Prefectures of the Jin dynasty (1115–1234)
Prefectures of the Yuan dynasty
Subprefectures of the Ming dynasty
Departments of the Qing dynasty